"I'll Be Your Shelter" is a song by American singer Taylor Dayne from her second studio album, Can't Fight Fate (1989). Written by Diane Warren and produced by Ric Wake, the song was released on March 20, 1990, by Arista Records as the third single from Can't Fight Fate.

"I'll Be Your Shelter" was a commercial success. In the United States, the single reached number four on the US Billboard Hot 100 and number 15 on the Adult Contemporary chart. In Canada, it topped the RPM Top 100 Singles chart on the week dated August 4, 1990, becoming Dayne's only chart-topper there. Outside North America, the song reached number four in Australia, number 33 in New Zealand, and number 43 in the United Kingdom.

Background
The song, written by American songwriter Diane Warren, was a departure from Taylor Dayne's dance music background, displaying more of a mid-tempo pop rock. As explained by Warren on American Top 40 with Shadoe Stevens, she originally intended for the song to be recorded by Tina Turner, but when Turner declined, the song was offered to Dayne instead. It features background vocals by Kathy Troccoli.

Critical reception
People Magazine wrote, "She has the spirit and rhythmic sense to turn "I'll Be Your Shelter", a tune by all-the-rage pop composer Diane Warren, into a vivacious party track. (The song’s only shortcoming is that the arrangement, by Dayne's producer Ric Wake, makes the sound a bit too reminiscent of Lone Justice's "Shelter".)" Steven Daly from Spin commented, "A brazen move onto Tina Turner's tuff turf, the track almost stalls thanks to some ham-fisted synth bass and clumsy drums, but by the sheer force of her personality the great Dayne gives Dianne Warren what she deserved—one more classic record in her favourite color, platinum."

Chart performance
In the United States, "I'll Be Your Shelter" was Dayne's seventh consecutive top-10 single on the Billboard Hot 100, where it peaked at number four during the summer of 1990. On the Billboard Year-End Hot 100 singles of 1990, the track ranked at number 63. The song also reached number one in Canada for one week in August 1990 and peaked at number four in Australia.

Music video
The accompanying music video for "I'll Be Your Shelter" was directed by American director Dominic Sena, who went on to direct such films as Gone in 60 Seconds and Swordfish. The music video was later included on Dayne's music video collection Twist of Fate.

Remix
Two remixes were produced for the release, giving it a more pop sound (the "Extended Remix" and the "Groove Mix"). These remixes were very difficult to find until they were released on her collection of remixes Dance Diva: Remixes & Rarities (2005). They are also both available on the 2014 deluxe re-issue of Can't Fight Fate.

Charts

Weekly charts

Year-end charts

Certifications

References

1989 songs
1990 singles
Music videos directed by Dominic Sena
RPM Top Singles number-one singles
Song recordings produced by Ric Wake
Songs written by Diane Warren
Taylor Dayne songs